Trim GAA is a Gaelic Athletic Association club based in Trim, in County Meath, Ireland. The club fields both Gaelic football and hurling teams. It competes in Meath GAA competitions.  Trim is known as the home of hurling in Meath and the Meath Senior Hurling Championship final was held there each year until the redevelopment of its facilities meant it was moved to Pairc Tailteann.

2011 Football Relegation

Trim finished at the bottom of Group A, with 3 points from 5 games and point difference of -30, the lowest of any team that year. Trim's only win was a 1-15 to 1-10 defeat of Blackhall Gaels on 7 August 2011. Trim's first relegation play-off was against Nobber on 20 August, Trim were beaten 3-8 to 1-16.

On 9 September 2011, Trim were beaten 1-11 to 2-9 by Duleek/Bellewstown in Páirc Tailteann in their second relegation play-off and were relegated to the Intermediate Football Championship. Trim were promoted to Senior Level football in 1949 and relegation ended a 62-year spell at Senior level, the second longest spell after Skryne who have been in the Senior Football Championship since 1938.

Honours
Meath Senior Hurling Championship: 26
1915 (Capt Maurice Power), 1916 (Capt Maurice Power), 1919 (Capt Maurice Power), 1920, 1921 (Maurice Power retires), 1935, 1940, 1941, 1942, 1949, 1950, 1952, 1955, 1956, 1957, 1959, 1960, 1987, 1988, 1989, 1992, 1994, 1995, 1998, 2000, 2001, 2020
Meath Senior Football Championship: 1
1962
Meath Intermediate Hurling Championship: 1
1973
Meath Junior Hurling Championship: 5
1918, 1919, 1985, 1986, 2000, 2019
Meath Intermediate Football Championship: 2
1949, 2021
Leinster Intermediate Club Football Championship: 1
2021
Meath Junior Football Championship: 2
1934, 1940
Meath Junior 2 Hurling Championship: 1
1987
Meath Junior B Football Championship: 4
1978, 1991, 1998, 2010
Feis Cup: 2
1976, 1961
Meath Minor Hurling A: 3
2011, 2016, 2018, 2019, 2021

External links
 Official web site

References

Gaelic games clubs in County Meath
Trim, County Meath